Duke Kao of Lu (died 994 BC or 995 BC), personal name Ji Qiu, was the second duke of Lu during the Western Zhou dynasty. He was a son of Bo Qin, the first duke. Ruling for four years, he was succeeded by his younger brother, Duke Yang. His reign began in either 998 or 997 BC, the one-year discrepancy due to the Records of the Grand Historian giving Duke Wu's reign as ten years in one chapter and nine years in another.

References

Monarchs of Lu (state)
Chinese dukes
10th-century BC Chinese monarchs